Polanówka may refer to the following places:
Polanówka, Lublin County in Lublin Voivodeship (east Poland)
Polanówka, Opole Lubelskie County in Lublin Voivodeship (east Poland)
Polanówka, Tomaszów Lubelski County in Lublin Voivodeship (east Poland)